Bernhard Jope (10 May 1914 – 31 July 1995) was a German bomber pilot during World War II. He was a recipient of the  Knight's Cross of the Iron Cross with Oak Leaves of Nazi Germany.

Biography
Bernhard Jope joined the military service of the Luftwaffe on 1 April 1935 after graduating from the Königliche Technische Hochschule zu Danzig (technical university in Gdańsk-Wrzeszcz) in aircraft construction. Prior to joining the military service he had already almost completed his flight training at the Deutsche Verkehrsfliegerschule (German Air Transport School).
 
In support of the Kriegsmarine, Jope flew the Focke-Wulf Fw 200 Condor on experimental missions across the North Sea and Atlantic Ocean on behalf of Deutsche Luft Hansa. On 26 October 1940 he spotted the troop transport  and severely damaged her with two 250 kg bombs.

During his time at Kampfgeschwader 100 (KG 100) Jope led an attack on 9 September 1943 on the Italian battle fleet that was sailing from La Spezia en route to Malta, to surrender to the Allies. Jope led a formation of eleven Dornier Do 217 bombers armed with the Fritz X radio controlled glide bomb and in the ensuing action the 45,000 ton  was hit twice and sank. The Roma's sister ship, was hit by a single Fritz and seriously damaged, but was able to make it to Malta. In later action, Jope and KG 100 scored hits with the Fritz on the British battleship  and cruiser , and the US cruiser .

After the war
After the war, Jope worked until his retirement as a pilot for Lufthansa. Jope died on 31 July 1995, in Königstein.

Awards

Iron Cross (1939) 2nd Class (27 September 1939) & 1st Class (12 September 1940)
German Cross in Gold on 5 February 1942 as Hauptmann in the I./KG 40
Knight's Cross of the Iron Cross with Oak Leaves
 Knight's Cross on 30 December 1940 as Oberleutnant and pilot in the 2./KG 40
 Oak Leaves on 24 March 1944 as Major and Geschwaderkommodore of KG 100

Notes

References

Citations

Bibliography

 
 
 
 
 
 
 

1914 births
1995 deaths
Military personnel from Leipzig
People from the Kingdom of Saxony
Lufthansa people
German World War II bomber pilots
Recipients of the Gold German Cross
Recipients of the Knight's Cross of the Iron Cross with Oak Leaves
Condor Legion personnel
Gdańsk University of Technology alumni